The Orbis Pictus Award for Outstanding Nonfiction for Children recognizes books which demonstrate excellence in the "writing of nonfiction for children." It is awarded annually by the National Council of Teachers of English to one American book published the previous year.  Up to five titles may be designated as Honor Books.
The award is named after the book considered to be the first picture book for children, Orbis Pictus (The World in Pictures), by John Amos Comenius, which was published in 1657. 
The award has recognized one book annually without exception since it was inaugurated in 1990.

Criteria
 The book must be "nonfiction literature which has as its central purpose the sharing of information". Biographies are welcome, but not "textbooks, historical fiction, folklore, or poetry".
 The book must have been published during the previous calendar year in the United States.
 The book must meet the literary criteria of accuracy, organization, design and style.
 Additionally, the book "should be useful in classroom teaching grades K-8, should encourage thinking and more reading, model exemplary expository writing and research skills, share interesting and timely subject matter, and appeal to a wide range of ages."

Recipients

Multiple awards
Two writers and no distinct illustrators have won the Orbis Pictus Award more than once.
 Jim Murphy, 1994, 1996, and 2004
 Russell Freedman, 1991 and 2006

See also

References

External links
 A New "Picture of the World": The NCTE Orbis Pictus Award for Outstanding Nonfiction for Children, Language Arts 68.6 (October 1991): 474–79
 The Best in Children's Nonfiction: Reading, Writing, & Teaching Orbis Pictus Award Books published by National Council of Teachers of English, 2001

American children's literary awards
Awards established in 1990
American non-fiction literary awards